The Tionesta Bridge is a girder bridge that carries U.S. Route 62 and Pennsylvania Route 36 across the Allegheny River in rural Forest County, Pennsylvania. The borough of Tionesta on the east bank of the river is connected with an unpopulated section of Tionesta Township on the west bank.

This 1961 structure was the first girder bridge completed along the river between the edge of suburban Pittsburgh and Kinzua Dam. Over the last 30 years, many nearby structures were completed with a similar design; this bridge was rehabilitated in 1988.

See also
List of crossings of the Allegheny River

References
Nat'l Bridges
Bridge Mapper

Bridges over the Allegheny River
Bridges completed in 1961
Transportation buildings and structures in Forest County, Pennsylvania
Road bridges in Pennsylvania
U.S. Route 62
Bridges of the United States Numbered Highway System
Girder bridges in the United States